Deacon is a male given name of Greek and English origin which means ‘messenger’ or ‘servant’. It is also a surname, relating to the occupation of a Deacon.

Notable people with the name include:

Surname 

Bernard Deacon (linguist), academic based at the Institute of Cornish Studies of the University of Exeter
Bert Deacon (1922–1974), Australian rules footballer
Brett Deacon (born 1982), English rugby union player
Bruce Deacon (born 1966), Canadian retired long-distance runner
Dan Deacon (born 1981), American musician
Donald Deacon (1920–2003), Canadian politician and businessman
George Deacon (1906–1984), British oceanographer and chemist
George Deacon (civil engineer) (1843–1909), English civil engineer, particularly involving water
Giles Deacon (born 1969), British fashion designer
Gill Deacon (born 1966), Canadian author and broadcaster
Henry Deacon (industrialist) (1822–1876), chemist and industrialist
Hilary Deacon (1936–2010), South African archaeologist
Joey Deacon (1920–1981), author who suffered from cerebral palsy
John Deacon, bassist for the rock band Queen
Keano Deacon, English footballer
Louis Deacon (born 1980), professional rugby union footballer
Paul Deacon (born 1979), former professional rugby league footballer
Richard Deacon (actor), American actor
Richard Deacon (sculptor), British sculptor
Rowan Deacon, English director and filmmaker
Russell Deacon (academic), Professor
Sharon Deacon (born 1957), Australian basketball player
Susan Deacon (born 1964), Scottish politician, academic, commentator and former Scottish cabinet minister
Terrence Deacon (born 1950), American anthropologist
Thomas Deacon (disambiguation), various people named either Thomas or Tom Deacon
Vera Deacon (1926–2021), Australian historian, writer and philanthropist

Given name 

Deacon Manu (born 1979), New Zealand-born Fijian rugby union footballer
Deacon John Moore (born 1941), American blues, rhythm and blues, and rock and roll musician, singer, and bandleader

References

English-language surnames
Occupational surnames
English-language occupational surnames